Ayman Omar Benarous (born 27 July 2003) is an English professional footballer who plays as a midfielder for Bristol City.

Club career
A youth product of Bristol City since the age of 6, Benarous signed his first professional contract with the club on 8 February 2021. He made his professional debut in a 2–1 win in the  EFL Championship against Barnsley on the 30th October 2021, coming on for Tyreeq Bakinson in the 67th minute after scoring a hat trick in a U23s game against Watford a few weeks earlier. This was Bristol City's first home win in 9 months. He made his full debut in a 1–1 draw at home to Blackburn. He played his fist FA cup game in a 1-0 Extra Time loss to Fulham, leaving the field after 77 minutes to be replaced by Kasey Palmer.  On February 1, 2022, after a run of successful games in the team, Benerous signed a new 3 year contract with Bristol City, keeping him at the club until 2025.

International career
Benarous was born in England to an Algerian father and English mother. He is a youth international for England, having represented the England U17s.

Career statistics

Honours

Individual 

 Bristol-born Player of the Year : 2021- 2022

References

External links
 

2003 births
Living people
Footballers from Bristol
English footballers
England youth international footballers
English people of Algerian descent
Association football midfielders
Bristol City F.C. players
English Football League players